Vladimir Nikolayevich Shcherbak  (1939–2010) was a Soviet and Russian CPSU functionary and politician. His last positions before the retirement in 2000 were Deputy Chairman of Government of the Russian Federation (1999–2000) and Minister of Agriculture (1999).

Buried in Troyekurovskoye Cemetery.

References

1939 births
2010 deaths
1st class Active State Councillors of the Russian Federation
20th-century Russian politicians
Burials in Troyekurovskoye Cemetery
Deputy heads of government of the Russian Federation
Agriculture ministers of Russia